Fotballklubben Toten is a Norwegian association football club located in Østre Toten, Innlandet. The club was founded 17 December 1995 as a cooperation club between several clus from Østre Toten. The team currently plays in 3. divisjon, the fourth tier of the Norwegian football league system.

History
FK Toten was founded 17 December 1995 as a cooperation club between Kapp IF, Lena IF og Skreia IL. Kapp IF later withdrew from the club.

7 December 2015 was a new cooperation project launched which Lena IF, Skreia IL, Kapp IF and Lensbygda SK committed to. The same agreement concluded with Kolbu IL, IL Kolbukameratene and Kolbu/KK Fotball joined as supporting clubs. In a press statement dated 21 October 2016, Skreia IL announced their withdrawal from FK Toten. The club won the 2019 4. divisjon and won promotion to 3. divisjon.

Recent seasons
{|class="wikitable"
|-bgcolor="#efefef"
! Season
!
! Pos.
! Pl.
! W
! D
! L
! GS
! GA
! P
!Cup
!Notes
|-
|2019
|4. divisjon
|align=right bgcolor=#DDFFDD| 1
|align=right|22||align=right|19||align=right|3||align=right|0
|align=right|108||align=right|18||align=right|60
|First round
|Promoted to 3. divisjon
|}

References

Football clubs in Norway
Sport in Oppland
Østre Toten
Association football clubs established in 1995
1995 establishments in Norway